The Colosseum is an elliptical amphitheater in Rome, Italy.

Colosseum or coliseum may also refer to:

Geography
 Colosseum, Queensland, a locality in the Gladstone Region, Queensland, Australia

Structures

Architecture

Coliseum
Arizona Veterans Memorial Coliseum, in Phoenix, Arizona
Baltimore Coliseum, Baltimore, Maryland (demolished)
Barton Coliseum, Little Rock, Arkansas
Bojangles Coliseum, Charlotte, North Carolina
Bronx Coliseum, The Bronx, New York City (defunct)
Carolina Coliseum, Columbia, South Carolina
Charlotte Coliseum, Charlotte, North Carolina (demolished)
Chicago Coliseum, Chicago, Illinois
Climate Pledge Arena (formerly known as "Seattle Center Coliseum"), Seattle, Washington
Coliseum Building and Hall, Minneapolis, Minnesota
Denver Coliseum, Denver, Colorado
El Paso County Coliseum, El Paso, Texas
Fair Park Coliseum (Dallas)
Fant–Ewing Coliseum, Monroe, Louisiana
Freeman Coliseum, San Antonio
Garrett Coliseum, Montgomery, Alabama
Greensboro Coliseum Complex, Greensboro, North Carolina
Hampton Coliseum, Hampton, Virginia
Humphrey Coliseum, Starkville, Mississippi
Hong Kong Coliseum, Hong Kong
Indiana Farmers Coliseum, formerly Pepsi Coliseum, Indianapolis
Kansas Coliseum, Wichita, Kansas (defunct)
Knoxville Civic Coliseum, Knoxville, Tennessee
Jacksonville Coliseum, an arena in Jacksonville, Florida from 1960 to 2003
José Miguel Agrelot Coliseum, San Juan, Puerto Rico
London Coliseum, London, UK (since 1904), home of English National Opera and English National Ballet
Los Angeles Memorial Coliseum, Exposition Park, Los Angeles, California
Miami Coliseum, Coral Gables, Florida (demolished)
Michigan State Fairgrounds Coliseum, Detroit
Mid-South Coliseum, in Memphis, Tennessee
Mississippi Coast Coliseum, Biloxi, Mississippi
Mississippi Coliseum, Jackson, Mississippi
Moody Coliseum, Dallas
Nassau Veterans Memorial Coliseum, Uniondale, New York
New Haven Coliseum, New Haven, Connecticut (demolished)
New York Coliseum, New York City (demolished)
Nissan Stadium (formerly known as "Adelphia Coliseum" and "The Coliseum" and later as "LP Field"), Nashville, Tennessee
North Charleston Coliseum, North Charleston, South Carolina
Northlands Coliseum, Edmonton, Alberta (defunct)
Oakland–Alameda County Coliseum, Oakland, California, or its associated BART station
Omni Coliseum, Atlanta, Georgia (demolished)
Oracle Arena (formerly known as "Oakland-Alameda County Coliseum Arena"), Oakland, California
Pacific Coliseum, in Vancouver, Canada
Rapides Parish Coliseum, Alexandria, Louisiana
Reynolds Coliseum, Raleigh, North Carolina
Richfield Coliseum, Richfield, Ohio (demolished)
Richmond Coliseum, Richmond, Virginia
Riverfront Coliseum, Cincinnati
Sam Houston Coliseum, Houston (demolished)
St. Louis Coliseum, St. Louis, Missouri (demolished)
St. Louis Exposition and Music Hall, St. Louis, Missouri (demolished)
Smart Araneta Coliseum, Manila, Philippines
Stegeman Coliseum, Athens, Georgia
Strahan Coliseum, San Marcos, Texas
Tad Smith Coliseum, Oxford, Mississippi
Tingley Coliseum, Albuquerque, New Mexico
Toyota Coliseum, now State Fair Coliseum, Syracuse, New York
Tulsa Coliseum, Tulsa, Oklahoma (destroyed by fire in 1952)
Washington Coliseum, Washington, DC (historic and defunct)
Williams Arena at Minges Coliseum, Greenville, North Carolina

Colosseum
Colosseum kino, Oslo, Norway
Colosseum Mall, retail park in Bucharest, Romania
Colosseum Theater, performance venue in Essen, Germany
London Colosseum, London, UK (1827–74)
The Colosseum (Manhattan), apartment building on Riverside Drive in New York
The Colosseum at Caesars Palace in Las Vegas
Regensburg subcamp, also known as the Colosseum subcamp, a subcamp of the Flossenbürg concentration camp in Stadtamhof, Regensburg, Bavaria, Germany
Bristol Motor Speedway, also known as "The Last Great Colosseum", an auto racing venue

Sports arenas
Coliséum, Amiens, France
Calumet Colosseum, ice hockey arena in Calumet, Michigan
Coliseum Burgos, an indoor arena in Burgos, Spain
Hilton Park (stadium), home of the Leigh rugby league club, was until recently known as the Coliseum
Copps Coliseum, home of the Hamilton Bulldogs hockey team
Northlands Coliseum, ice hockey arena in Edmonton, Alberta, Canada
WVU Coliseum, a multi-purpose arena on the campus of West Virginia University
Arena Coliseu Mateus Aquino, a controversial football stadium in Alto Santo, Ceará, Brazil

Arts, entertainment, and media

Games
Colosseum (board game), a board game released by Days of Wonder
Colosseum: Road to Freedom, a video game
Pokémon Colosseum, a video game

Music
Coliseum (album), the 2004 self-titled debut album by Coliseum
Coliseum (band), a punk rock band formed in 2003
Colosseum (band), a British progressive jazz-rock band formed in 1968
Colosseum II, a jazz fusion band
 Colosseum (album)

Brands and enterprises
Coliseum Video, a video distribution company founded by Vince McMahon
Colosseum Tournament, a Romanian-based kickboxing promotion company
Coliseum, a brand name of theatre chains owned by Famous Players

Transportation
Coliseum station (Edmonton), light rail station in Alberta, Canada
Oakland Coliseum station, rapid transit station in California, United States
Colosseum (train), an express train linking Rome, Milan, and Frankfurt am Main 1984–1997

See also
Coliseum Theatre (disambiguation)
Memorial Coliseum (disambiguation)